Secret Patrol is a 1936 American-Canadian Western film directed by David Selman and starring Charles Starrett, Finis Barton and J.P. McGowan. It was shot in Vancouver.

Cast
 Charles Starrett as RCMP Cpl. Alan Craig  
 Finis Barton as Jean  
 J.P. McGowan as Blacksmith Barstow  
 Henry Mollison as Constable Gene Barkley  
 Le Strange Millman as C.J. McCord  
 James McGrath as Tim Arnold 
 Arthur Kerr as Jordan  
 Reginald Hincks as Superintendent Barkley

References

Bibliography
 Mike Gasher. Hollywood North: The Feature Film Industry in British Columbia. UBC Press, 2002.

External links
 

1936 films
1930s action films
1930s English-language films
American action films
Canadian action films
English-language Canadian films
Films directed by David Selman
Columbia Pictures films
Royal Canadian Mounted Police in fiction
American black-and-white films
Canadian black-and-white films
1930s American films
1930s Canadian films